This is a List of Tamil Nadu Twenty20 cricket records, with each list containing the top five performances in the category.

Currently active players are bolded.

Team records

Highest innings totals

Lowest innings totals

Largest margin of runs victory

Batting records

Most Career Runs

Highest individual scores

Bowling records

Best innings bowling

Notes

All lists are referenced to ESPNCricinfo.

See also

 Tamil Nadu cricket team
 List of Tamil Nadu List A cricket records
 List of Tamil Nadu first-class cricket records

Cricket in Tamil Nadu